Barbara Pennington (born 1950s) is an American Hi-NRG and soul music artist of the 1970s and 1980s.

Career
Pennington was born in Chicago and began her musical career when she was discovered by Danny Leake and introduced to Hi-NRG and soul record producer Ian Levine who had come to the United States in search of new talent for his burgeoning record label.  

By the early 1980s, she had scored several disco hits, then several more Hi-NRG hits across mainland Europe. Her Stateside success was more variable, but not a failure. "Twenty Four Hours a Day" also became a disco hit in the U.S., peaking at #4 on the Club Play Chart, and "You Are the Music in Me" which peaked at #20 in 1977.

Her single "On a Crowded Street", from the album Out of the Darkest Night, became popular on both sides of the Atlantic in 1985. Follow up singles such as "All American Boy", "Don't Stop the World", "Way Down Deep in My Soul", "Fan the Flame", and "Out of the Darkest Night" all became major European hits, while remaining relatively unknown in the U.S.

Pennington retired in the early 1990s. Her final release was the 1995 compilation album, The Very Best of Barbara Pennington.

Discography

Albums
 Midnight Ride - (1979) United Artists Records
 Out of the Darkest Night - (1985) Record Shack Records
 The Very Best of Barbara Pennington - (1995) Hot Productions

Singles
 "Running in Another Direction"
 "Twenty Four Hours a Day"
 "You Are the Music Within Me"
 "Spend a Little Time with Me"
 "I Can't Erase the Thoughts of You"
 "There Are Brighter Days"
 "Don't Stop the World"
 "Way Down Deep in My Soul"
 "Midnight Ride"
 "Fan the Flame"
 "I Can't Keep My Heart Still"
 "All American Boy"
 "I've Been a Bad Girl"
 "On a Crowded Street"

References

External links
[ Allmusic.com biography]

1950s births
Living people
Singers from Chicago
American women singers
American soul singers
American disco musicians
American dance musicians
American hi-NRG musicians
American women in electronic music
21st-century American women